Sobrinho may refer to :

Adi Sobrinho (1985-), a Brazilian footballer 
Eduardo Jorge Martins Alves Sobrinho, a Brazilian physician and politician
Estádio Major José Levy Sobrinho, a multi-use stadium in Limeira.
Jean Theodoro Sobrinho (1993-), Brazilian footballer
Luís Sobrinho (1961-), a retired Portuguese footballer.